Murmurations is the sixth studio album by English electronic music duo Simian Mobile Disco. It was released on 11 May 2018 under Wichita Recordings. The album title and many of the track titles are inspired by how the members of the choir ended up following the sounds of their nearest neighbors, much like flocking birds.

Critical reception

Murmurations was met with "generally favorable" reviews from critics. At Metacritic, which assigns a weighted average rating out of 100 to reviews from mainstream publications, this release received an average score of 75, based on 13 reviews.

Track listing

Re-Murmurations
A remix album called Re-Murmurations was released on September 28, 2018.

Track listing

References

2018 albums
Simian Mobile Disco albums
Wichita Recordings albums